Sir Martin John Gilbert  (25 October 1936 – 3 February 2015) was a British historian and honorary Fellow of Merton College, Oxford. He was the author of eighty-eight books, including works on Winston Churchill, the 20th century, and Jewish history including the Holocaust.
He was a member of the Chilcot Inquiry into Britain's role in the Iraq War.

Early life
Martin Gilbert was born in London, the first child of Peter Gilbert, a north London jeweller, and his wife, Miriam. The original family name was Goldberg. All four of his grandparents had been born in the Pale of Settlement in Tsarist Russia (today's Poland and Lithuania). Nine months after the outbreak of the Second World War, he was evacuated to Canada as part of the British efforts to safeguard children. Vivid memories of the transatlantic crossing from Liverpool to Quebec sparked his curiosity about the war in later years.

After the war, Gilbert attended Highgate School, where he was taught history by the Balkan expert Alan Palmer, and politics by T. N. Fox. He described himself as being interested in "Jewish things" from a young age, noting that at school he "once or twice got in trouble for my Zionistic activities." He then completed two years of National Service in the Intelligence Corps before going on to study at Magdalen College at the University of Oxford.  Gilbert graduated in 1960 with a Bachelor of Arts degree with first-class honours in modern history. One of his tutors at Oxford was A. J. P. Taylor. After his graduation, Gilbert undertook postgraduate research at St Antony's College, Oxford.

Career

Historian and author
After two years of postgraduate work, Gilbert was approached by Randolph Churchill to assist his work on a biography of his father, Sir Winston Churchill. That same year, 1962, Gilbert was made a Fellow of Merton College, Oxford, and became a part of a circle of academics that included C.S. Lewis and J.R.R. Tolkien.  He spent the next few years combining his own research projects in Oxford with being part of Randolph's research team in Suffolk, who were working on the first two volumes of the Churchill biography. When Randolph died in 1968, Gilbert was commissioned to take over the task, completing the remaining six main volumes of the biography.

Gilbert spent the next 20 years on the Churchill project, publishing a number of other books throughout the time. Each main volume of the biography is accompanied by two or three volumes of documents initially called Companions, and so the biography currently runs to 28 volumes (over 30,000 pages), with another 3 document volumes still planned. Michael Foot, reviewing a volume of Gilbert's biography of Churchill in the New Statesman in 1971, praised his meticulous scholarship and wrote: "Whoever made the decision to make Martin Gilbert Churchill's biographer deserves a vote of thanks from the nation. Nothing less would suffice."

In the 1960s, Gilbert compiled a number of historical atlases. His other major works include a single-volume history on the Holocaust, as well as the single-volume histories First World War and Second World War. He also wrote a three-volume series called A History of the Twentieth Century. Gilbert described himself as an "archival historian" who made extensive use of primary sources in his work. Interviewed by the BBC on the subject of Holocaust research in 2005, Gilbert said he believed that the "tireless gathering of facts will ultimately consign Holocaust deniers to history."

By the 1980s Gilbert's academic attention had also turned towards the Refusenik movement in the Soviet Union. Gilbert authored Jews of Hope: The Plight of Soviet Jewry Today (1984) and Shcharansky: Hero of Our Time (1986), and he presented on behalf of the Soviet Jewry Movement in a variety of contexts, ranging from large forums such as formal representation before the United Nations Commission on Human Rights to smaller forums such as an educational slideshow for the general public on behalf of the Soviet Jewry Information Centre.

In 1995, Gilbert retired as a Fellow of Merton College but was made an Honorary Fellow. In 1999 he was awarded a Doctor of Letters degree by the University of Oxford "for the totality of his published work". 

Gilbert was noted for his endorsement of Bat Ye'or and his Eurabia theory, providing a cover comment for her 2005 book, and has stated that the theory "is 100 percent accurate". One of Gilbert's last books, In Ishmael's House: A History of the Jews in Muslim Lands cited Ye'or with approval several times.

Public service
Gilbert was appointed in June 2009 as a member of the British government's inquiry into the Iraq War (headed by Sir John Chilcot). His appointment to this inquiry was criticised in parliament by William Hague, Clare Short, and George Galloway on the basis of scepticism over his neutrality, Gilbert having written in 2004 that George W. Bush and Tony Blair may in the future be esteemed to the same degree as Churchill and Franklin D. Roosevelt. In an article for The Independent on Sunday published in November 2009, Oliver Miles, the former British ambassador to Libya, objected to the presence of Gilbert and Sir Lawrence Freedman on the committee partly because of their Jewish background and Gilbert's Zionist sympathies. In a later interview, Gilbert saw Miles's attack as being motivated by antisemitism.

Reception
Many laud Gilbert's books and atlases for their meticulous scholarship and his clear and objective presentation of complex events. His book on World War I is described as a majestic, single-volume work incorporating all major fronts—domestic, diplomatic, military—for "a stunning achievement of research and storytelling." Catholic sources describe him as a "fair-minded, conscientious collector of facts."

Gilbert's portrayal of Churchill's supportive attitudes to Jews (in his book Churchill and the Jews) has been criticised, for example, by Piers Brendon and Michael J. Cohen. Furthermore, Tom Segev writes that although Gilbert's book The Story of Israel is written with "encyclopaedic clarity," it suffers from the absence of figures from Arab sources.

Honours and awards
In 1990, Gilbert was made a Commander of the Order of the British Empire (CBE). In 1995, he was awarded a knighthood "for services to British history and international relations". In 2003 Gilbert was awarded the Dr. Leopold Lucas Prize by the University of Tübingen. In 2012, he won the Dan David Prize for his contribution to "History/Biography". The Sir Martin Gilbert Library at Highgate School, where he was a pupil, was opened on 6 May 2014 by former Prime Minister Gordon Brown. "I know he helped Lady Thatcher, John Major and Tony Blair, but he also helped me a great deal with his insights into history", said Brown. "I know he advised Harold Wilson even before them, but at every point Martin was available and he wanted to believe that the best outcomes were possible. A genuine humanitarian, someone whose writing of history taught him we could always do better in the future if we are able to learn the lessons of history."

Honorary degrees
Gilbert received honorary degrees from several universities. These include:

Fellowships
Gilbert was a Fellow of the following  institutions:

Personal life
Gilbert was the target of a serious attempt by the State Protection Authority of Hungary to recruit him as an agent in the early 1960s. He initially responded warmly, and agreed to go on a Hungarian government-funded trip to Budapest in September 1961, and expressed views about Britain which seemed designed to impress his Hungarian hosts (mixed with some untruths about his background). The Hungarians attempted to intercept the many letters he sent back home during the trip, and were able to work out that Gilbert was lying about being a Communist. When invited to a further meeting in Paris, Gilbert did not show up and eventually when his intended handler defected to the West, the Hungarians gave up. Gilbert never explained the incident himself; writing about it in 2015, Hungarian historian Krisztián Ungváry noted that Gilbert must have realised what was going on, and may have been used by the British intelligence services to plant a double agent.

In 1963, he married Helen Constance Robinson, with whom he had a daughter. He had two sons with his second wife, Susan Sacher, whom he married in 1974. From 2005, he was married to the Holocaust historian Esther Gilbert, née Goldberg. Gilbert described himself as a proud practising Jew and a Zionist.

Death
In March 2012, while on a trip to Jerusalem, Gilbert developed a heart arrhythmia from which he never recovered. He died in London on 3 February 2015, aged 78. Gilbert asked to be buried in Israel, and a Memorial Tribute attended by Gordon Brown and Randolph Churchill (that is, Randolph Leonard Spencer-Churchill, the great-grandson of Winston Churchill) was organised on 24 November 2015 in the Western Marble Arch Synagogue, London.

Gilbert's death was announced on 4 February 2015 by Sir John Chilcot. Giving evidence before the Foreign Affairs Select Committee about delays in the publication of the report of the Iraq Inquiry, Chilcot reported that Gilbert had died the previous night following a long illness.

Books

Biography of Winston Churchill
Volumes one and two were written by Churchill's son Randolph Churchill, who also edited the two companions to volume one. Gilbert's first work as official biographer was to supervise the posthumous publication of the three companions to volume two, but these were published in Randolph Churchill's name, and indeed, Randolph had already compiled most of the material in his lifetime. In 2008, Gilbert announced that the job of publishing the remaining companion volumes had been taken over by the Hillsdale Press, and the first of these appeared in 2014. The Hillsdale Press had already reprinted the complete biography in eight volumes and the sixteen published companion volumes, as a series titled "The Churchill Documents", so that the volume of 2014 became the seventeenth instalment of this series. Gilbert was incapacitated shortly after its publication, so that subsequent volumes were posthumously published by Gilbert's former research assistant Larry Arnn, with Gilbert credited as co-author.

Companion volumes
  (in two volumes)
  (in three volumes)

Other books on Winston Churchill
 , a short biography for use in schools
 
 
 
 
 
 
 
 
 
 , retitled Winston Churchill's War Leadership

Other biographies and history books
 
 
 
 
 
 
 , A Study of Imperial Rule in India from 1905 to 1910 as told through the correspondence and diaries of Sir James Dunlop-Smith, Private Secretary to the Viceroy of India
 
 
 
 
 , for use in schools
 
 
 
 
 
 
 
 
 , for use in schools
 
 
 
 
 
 
 
 
 
 
 
 
 
 
 
 
 
 
 
 
 
 , condensed version of his three volume history

See also
Fori Nehru

References

External links

 Obituary in The Independent by Marcus Williamson
 
 
 
 
The Papers of Sir Martin Gilbert held at Churchill Archives Centre

1936 births
2015 deaths
Alumni of Magdalen College, Oxford
Alumni of St Antony's College, Oxford
British expatriates in Canada
British military historians
British military writers
Commanders of the Order of the British Empire
English biographers
English historians
English Jewish writers
English Jews
English military writers
Fellows of Churchill College, Cambridge
Fellows of Merton College, Oxford
Fellows of the Royal Society of Literature
Hillsdale College people
Historians of Europe
Historians of the British Isles
Historians of the Holocaust
Historians of the Middle East
Historians of World War I
Historians of World War II
Intelligence Corps soldiers
Iraq Inquiry
Jewish historians
Knights Bachelor
Members of the Privy Council of the United Kingdom
People educated at Highgate School
Academic staff of the University of Western Ontario